Aaron Whittaker (born 9 July 1968) is a New Zealand former professional rugby league footballer. A New Zealand international representative halfback, he played club football in Australia, England and New Zealand.

Early years
Whittaker grew up in Christchurch and was a Schoolboy Kiwi in 1983 before becoming part of the dominant Canterbury rugby league side of the early nineties. The side was coached by Frank Endacott and included future stars such as Whetu Taewa, Quentin Pongia and Brent Stuart. In Christchurch he played for two clubs: the Halswell Hornets and the Riccarton Knights.

His form was impressive enough to land a contract in the NSWRL Premiership, signing with the Illawarra Steelers in 1992. Whittaker played in three games for the club, including a try-scoring effort against the Great Britain touring side, returning to New Zealand at the end of the year.

In 1993, Whittaker was selected for the New Zealand national rugby league team. He went on to play thirteen games for the national side, although only three were test matches. During this time, he trained with Gary Freeman and Daryl Halligan and this allowed him to improve his halfback and goal kicking skills. In 1994, he was part of the Kiwis tour of Papua New Guinea. Between 1990 and 1994, he played in 17 games for Canterbury, scoring thirteen tries.

England
In 1994, he played for the Canterbury Cardinals in the new Lion Red Cup and at the half way stage was the competition's leading points scorer. As a result, he began to attract interest from overseas clubs and agreed to a mid-season transfer, joining Wakefield Trinity. He returned to the Cardinals in the English offseason and played in part of the 1995 Lion Red Cup.

Return to New Zealand
After a spell in England, he returned to New Zealand, signing for the Auckland Warriors. He played eight first grade games for the Warriors in the 1997 and 1998 seasons under the club's new head coach Frank Endacott.

After being released by the Warriors, he returned to local football in Canterbury, playing for his old side the Haswell Hornets. In 2001, he was involved in the South Island team that played the touring French side.

Later years
He now has 3 children with his wife, his oldest boy following in his footsteps becoming a well-refined league player. His two younger daughters are both sports based as well.

In 2002, he was named the head trainer for the New Zealand 'A' sides tour of France and the United States, a position he retained for the sides 2003 tour of Australia, where he worked under former teammate Terry Hermansson.

He is now involved with the Currumbin Eagles JRL as a coach where he has steered numerous teams to finals contention. He also is involved with the Gold Coast Rugby League as a referee.

References

1968 births
Living people
Canterbury rugby league team players
Illawarra Steelers players
Wakefield Trinity players
New Zealand Warriors players
New Zealand national rugby league team players
New Zealand rugby league players
New Zealand rugby league referees
South Island rugby league team players
Halswell Hornets players
Riccarton Knights players
Rugby league halfbacks
Rugby league players from Christchurch